Princess Anna may refer to:

 Anna (Frozen), a character from Disney's Frozen
 Anna, Grand Duchess of Lithuania (died 1418), Grand Duchess of Lithuania (1392–1418)
 Anna of Denmark (1532–1585), Electress of Saxony and Margravine of Meissen
 Anna of Poland, Countess of Celje (1366–1425), countess consort of Celje in Slovenia
 Anna of Russia (1693–1740), Empress of Russia from 1730 to 1740